Ololygon brieni is a species of frogs in the family Hylidae.

It is endemic to Brazil.
Its natural habitats are subtropical or tropical moist lowland forests, subtropical or tropical moist montane forests, rivers, freshwater marshes, arable land, pastureland, plantations, rural gardens, urban areas, heavily degraded former forest, ponds, irrigated land, seasonally flooded agricultural land, and canals and ditches.

References

brieni
Endemic fauna of Brazil
Amphibians described in 1930
Taxonomy articles created by Polbot